Kreis Posen Ost was a Kreis in Prussia (county) in the southern administrative district of Posen, in the province of Posen.

Demographics 
In 1910, the district had a population of 49,119. According to the 1910 Prussian census, 14,102 (28.71%) spoke German, 34,795 (70.84%) spoke Polish, 178 (0.36%) were bilingual and 44 (0.09%) spoken other languages.

History

Geographical features

Table of Standesamter
"Standesamt" is the German name of the local civil registration offices which were established in October 1874 soon after the German Empire was formed. Births, marriages and deaths were recorded.

Table of all communities

Table of office holders

References

External links

Districts of the Province of Posen